Minshew is a surname. Notable people with the surname include:

Alicia Minshew (born 1974), American actress
Gardner Minshew (born 1996), American football quarterback
Kathryn Minshew (born 1985), American businesswoman
Nancy Minshew, American psychiatrist and professor
Wayne Minshew (1936–2015), American journalist and minor league baseball player